Raskasta Joulua is a music project from Finland in which diverse artists have recorded traditional Christmas carols and Christmas hits in a heavy metal style. "Raskasta joulua" is a term in Finnish which means "heavy Christmas" in English. The concept was founded by guitarist Erkka Korhonen in 2004. Many notable Finnish metal vocalists have appeared on Raskasta Joulua albums and tours, including Marko Hietala, Jarkko Ahola, Ari Koivunen, Juha-Pekka Leppaluoto and Tony Kakko.

The band's first album, Raskasta Joulua, contained performances by the Trans-Siberian Orchestra and was produced by T2 Productions. The album was released in December 2004.

The second album was released on the Warner label in 2006 after a promotional 3-concert tour in December 2005 increased the popularity of the project. This led to increased sales of the subsequent releases. Raskasta Joulua have toured every year since 2005 and the 3 concert tour has become an annual tradition.

In 2013 the band changed their record label for the second time and signed to Spinefarm Records. They also released their second self-titled album, which achieved platinum status in Finland. In 2014, it was followed by two new albums, Raskasta Joulua 2 and Ragnarok Juletide, the latter of which is their first album recorded in the English language. The other albums are in Finnish.

Discography 

 Raskasta Joulua (Heavy Christmas) (T2 Productions, 2004)
 Raskaampaa Joulua (Heavier Christmas) (Warner, 2006)
 Raskasta Joulua (Heavy Christmas) (Spinefarm, 2013)
 Raskasta Joulua Kaksi (Heavy Christmas 2) (Spinefarm, 2014)
 Ragnarok Juletide (Spinefarm, 2014)
 Tulkoon joulu - akustisesti (Spinefarm, 2015)
 Raskasta Joulua IV (Spinefarm, 2017)
 Viides Adventti (Gramophone Records, 2022)

Members

2016 line-up 
 Erkka Korhonen – guitar
 Vili Ollila – keyboards
 Mirka Rantanen – drums
 Erkki Silvennoinen – bass 
 Tuomas Wäinölä – guitar
 Marko Hietala – vocals
 JP Leppäluoto – vocals
 Ari Koivunen – vocals
 Antony Parviainen – vocals
 Tommi Salmela – vocals
 Pasi Rantanen – vocals
 Kimmo Blom – vocals
 Elize Ryd – vocals
 Antti Railio – vocals
 Ville Tuomi – vocals
 Floor Jansen – vocals
 Jarkko Ahola – vocals
 Tarja Turunen - vocals

References

External links 

 

Finnish heavy metal musical groups
Musical groups established in 2004
2004 establishments in Finland